Government of India has approved a scheme of National Projects to be implemented during XI Plan(2007-2012) with a view to expedite completion of identified National Projects for the benefit of the people. Such projects will be provided financial assistance by the Government of India in the form of Central grant which will be 90% of the estimated cost of such projects for their completion in a time bound manner.
I. Criteria for selection of National Projects
II. Procedure for inclusion as National project
III.Funding of the National Project
IV. Work plan and time schedule for completion of National Projects
V. Monitoring for National Projects
VI. Review by steering committee 
VI. Evaluation and impact assessment

See also
 Indian Rivers Inter-link
 List of major rivers of India
 List of National Waterways in India

References

External links 
 

National Projects of the Ministry of Water Resources
Proposed infrastructure in India
Ministry of Water Resources (India)